Joy Odiete is a Nigerian film director and film distributor. She is known for her directing roles in Gone and Money Miss Road. She is the CEO of Blue Pictures entertainment  and an affiliate director of Warner Brothers Pictures, Walt Disney Pictures and Black Sheep Entertainment.

Career 
Joy Odiete joined the movie industry in 2005. She worked with Silverbird Cinemas and Nu Metro Cinema before venturing into movie production and eventually established a cinema.

Blue Pictures Entertainment 
She is the managing director of the Blue Pictures Entertainment, a Nigerian-based film distribution company established in 2006. The distribution company is in control of 54 cinemas and 215 screens.

Filmography 

 Money Miss Road (2022)
 Gone
 A Bitter Pill (2021)

References

External links 
 

Nigerian film directors
Nigerian film actresses
Nigerian film producers
21st-century Nigerian actresses
Nigerian women film directors
Nigerian businesspeople
Nigerian chief executives
Year of birth missing (living people)
Living people